The following is a list of the countries and territories where Afrikaans or Dutch are official languages. It includes countries, which have Afrikaans and/or Dutch as (one of) their nationwide official language(s), as well as dependent territories with Afrikaans and/or Dutch as a co-official language.

Worldwide, Afrikaans and Dutch as native or second language are spoken by approximately 46 million people. There is a high degree of mutual intelligibility between the two languages, particularly in written form. As an estimated 90 to 95% of Afrikaans vocabulary is ultimately of Dutch origin, there are few lexical differences between the two languages; however, Afrikaans has a considerably more regular morphology, grammar, and spelling.

Afrikaans or Dutch as official languages 
Afrikaans and/or Dutch are the official language of five sovereign countries, which lie in the Americas, Africa and Europe. These countries are referred to as the Nederlands taalgebied (Dutch language area). The Netherlands, Belgium and Suriname are member states of the Dutch Language Union; South Africa refuses to become a member state although Afrikaans is integrated in the task statement of the Dutch Language Union.

Dependent entities 
Afrikaans and/or Dutch are co-official languages in several dependent entities. At certain administrative levels in the Kingdoms of the Netherlands and Belgium the Dutch language is a co-official language. The same happens with Afrikaans in South Africa.

Kingdom of the Netherlands 
In the Kingdom of the Netherlands Dutch is the only language that has an official status in all spheres of administration. At the federal level, in most provinces and municipalities Dutch is the sole administrative language. However, in some constituent countries, a province and some municipalities Dutch is a co-official language, together with West Frisian, Papiamento or English.

Belgium 
At the federal level Dutch, French and German are co-official languages. In the Flanders Region Dutch is the sole official language. In Brussels-Capital Region Dutch and French are co-official languages. In the Wallonia Region French and German are co-official languages, but in four municipalities with language facilities limited government services are also available in Dutch.

South Africa 
Between 1910 and 1961 Dutch was a co-official language of South Africa, together with English. In 1961 Dutch was replaced by Afrikaans as a co-official language. However, between 1925 and 1984 Dutch and Afrikaans were seen as two varieties of the same language by the Official Languages of the Union Act, 1925 and later article 119 of the South African Constitution of 1961. After a short period (1984-1994) where Afrikaans and English were the two co-official languages of South Africa, Afrikaans has been one of eleven official languages since 1994.

Since 2012 a new language policy has been implemented where working languages of all government institutions were established. Every government institution is required to establish three working languages out of the eleven official languages. Provinces and municipalities are obligated to take into account the local language demographics before establishing three working languages.

Other legal statuses 
Dutch is not an official language in Indonesia, but the language is widely used in Indonesia as a source language after a 350-year colonial period. Certainly in law, Dutch has some official status as many colonial laws are available in Dutch only.

Although Dutch is the native language of people in French Flanders, Dutch is not an official language in France or French Flanders.

International institutions 
Afrikaans and/or Dutch are an official languages of the following international institutions:
  Benelux Union (nld)
  (afr)
  Caribbean Community (nld)
  (nld)
  Union of South American Nations (nld)
 Dutch Language Union (afr/nld)

See also 
 Afrikaans speaking population in South Africa
 Differences between Afrikaans and Dutch
 Dutch Language Union

References 

Afrikaans or Dutch

Afrikaans
Cultural regions